Timothy Blake Robinson (born 28 April 2002) is a New Zealand cricketer. He made his Twenty20 debut on 26 November 2021, for Wellington in the 2021–22 Men's Super Smash. He made his first-class debut on 20 March 2022, for Wellington in the 2021–22 Plunket Shield season. Later the same month in the Plunket Shield, Robinson scored his maiden century in first-class cricket.

References

External links
 

2002 births
Living people
New Zealand cricketers
Wellington cricketers
Place of birth missing (living people)